Dual identity can refer to:

 A secret identity, such as Clark Kent and Superman
 In mathematics, the coidentity of a dual group object or the counit of a coalgebra